Ola Mafaalani (born 1968) is a Syrian-born theater director.  she is the artistic director of the Noord Nederlands Toneel (NNT) in Groningen, in the Netherlands.

Mafaalani was born in Syria and moved with her family to Germany at age 2, where lived in Bochum and studied film and television. She continued her studies in theater in Amsterdam, and has lived in the Netherlands since 1992. Her first production, Harige Machines ("Hairy machines") was performed in Groningen in 1995, at the Grand Theatre; since then she has worked for the Royal Flemish Theatre, the Kölner Schauspielhaus, and Toneelgroep Amsterdam, before becoming the artistic director at NNT, a position she holds until the end of 2016, when she was succeeded by Guy Weizman.

Mafaalani is married to writer and director Ko van den Bosch. Her outspokenness has been the subject of some controversy; when she opened the Dutch Theater Festival in Amsterdam in 2015, her speech was concerned not so much with drama per se but more with her concern about the lack of involvement outside and inside the theater with the European refugee crisis, a point she illustrated by sharing the stage with a hundred refugees.

References

1968 births
Living people